5 A Day Adventures is an edutainment computer product developed by eMotion Studios.

Purpose
The software teaches third-grade students to eat fruits and vegetables daily. It  features singing and rapping partially-clothed cartoon fruit and vegetables that explain how their actual counterparts are grown, nutritionally valued and cooked.

Publication history
The program was published and produced by the Dole Food Company, in collaboration with the Society for Nutrition Education and Behavior. It was given to more than 18,000 schools across the United States and bundled with the Macintosh Quadra 630 series. In all, 270,000 copies were distributed.

See also 

 Preventice

References

External links
 Society for Nutrition Education
 Dole 5 a Day Adventures 
 (cannot be opened unless connected to the Virginia Tech campus networks)

1993 software
Health software
Windows software
Macintosh software